Kent Fredrik Persson (born 3 March 1971) is a Swedish politician who was party secretary of the Moderate Party from 2012 to 2015. On 18 December 2014, Persson announced that he will resign as party secretary following the party's leadership election on 10 January 2015, and also leave the political arena.

From 2011 to 2012, Persson was the opposition leader in Örebro Municipality and was earlier opposition leader for Örebro County Council. He was also provincial chairman of the Moderate Party  in Örebro County until 2012 and was a member of the executive board of the Moderate Party from 2011 to 2015.

Kent Persson is married and has two children. He is a teetotaler.

References

External links 
Kent Persson – Moderat.se

Moderate Party politicians
Living people
1971 births